The 2012 World Wrestling Championships was held at Millennium Place in Strathcona County, Alberta, Canada. Traditionally, Wrestling World Championships are not held in Olympic years, but in 2012 a female championship was held because the 2012 Summer Olympics included only four of the seven FILA weight classes for females.

Medal table

Team ranking

Medal summary

Women's freestyle

Participating nations
111 competitors from 28 nations participated.

 (7)
 (7)
 (2)
 (2)
 (7)
 (7)
 (2)
 (2)
 (1)
 (2)
 (3)
 (1)
 (2)
 (7)
 (1)
 (7)
 (7)
 (1)
 (1)
 (7)
 (4)
 (3)
 (7)
 (1)
 (2)
 (4)
 (7)
 (7)

See also
Wrestling at the 2012 Summer Olympics

References 

Results Book

External links 
 

 
World Wrestling Championships
FILA Wrestling World Championships
World Wrestling Championships
Sport in Alberta
Wrestling World Championships
2012 in Alberta